"Cooperative Calligraphy" is the eighth episode of the second season of the American comedy television series Community, and the 33rd episode of the series overall. It aired in the United States on NBC on November 11, 2010. It is often considered a bottle episode.

Plot

While the study group finishes their diorama for their anthropology class, Dean Pelton (Jim Rash) invites everyone for a puppy parade. Annie (Alison Brie) notices that her purple gel grip pen is missing, but the others dismiss her concerns. Enraged, Annie claims she's tired of lending her stuff and not get it back, and demands everyone to stay to find the pen.

Unsuccessful in finding the pen, the group starts to leave, not before Annie accuses Britta (Gillian Jacobs) of being the one who stole it. This escalates to a full search of everyone's stuff, and everyone starts to accuse each other. Annie tries to get Jeff (Joel McHale) to take control of the situation,  but when Jeff's advice to the group is taken as an admission of guilt, he institutes a lockdown, forcing everyone to stay in the room until the pen is found.

As they work through the bags, they discover disconcerting secrets about each member of the study group. Abed's (Danny Pudi) journal is discovered to have been tracking the three women's menstrual cycles so that he knows the best days to talk to them. They discover a pregnancy test in Shirley's (Yvette Nicole Brown) bag; she claims that she rekindled her relationship with her ex-husband over Labor Day weekend, but Abed points out that his charts show that she was last ovulating during Halloween. Troy (Donald Glover), remembering that Shirley had sex with Chang on Halloween, realizes that Chang might be the father of her child.
Shirley and Britta get into a heated argument about religion and sex before Jeff snaps and tears apart the room looking for the pen. The group proposes strip-searching each other to prove no one has taken it, dividing the room by gender to search themselves, to no avail. Eventually, they decide Pierce (Chevy Chase) must have stuck it down one of his leg casts. They cut the casts open, but the pen is not there.

The group sits around in regret and Jeff points out the bonds between them were so strong, it was impossible for anyone to have taken the pen and still not have confessed. Such an act was so unlikely, saying that a ghost took the pen would be more reasonable. Satisfied with this, the group leaves the destroyed study room, too late to join the puppy parade.

After the group leaves, Troy's monkey Annie's Boobs appears from a vent in the study room, snatching a spoon and taking it back to its cache of stolen objects, which includes all of Annie's missing pens.

Reception
In its original broadcast, "Cooperative Calligraphy" reached approximately 5.635 million households with a 2.0 rating/6% share in the 18-49 demographic.

The episode received positive reviews from critics, with Michelle St. James of Daemon's TV writing, "From Annie’s primal scream to almost every single Troy line ('Do they find thoughts in our butts? I knew I should have read that book.'), “Cooperative Calligraphy” is packed with hilarity, character development, and puppies."

Cory Barker of TVsurveillance wrote, "'Cooperative Calligraphy' is both the culmination of the last 15 episodes and the catalyst for a number of surely-awesome plots and episodes to come. It’s a reminder that Community can be just as hilarious when telling intensely personal and small-scale stories as it is when riffing on pop culture’s biggest genres and formats. And that’s why it is television’s best comedy."

References

External links
 "Cooperative Calligraphy" at NBC.com
 

Community (season 2) episodes
2010 American television episodes
Bottle television episodes
Metafictional television episodes